The 2014–15 Jacksonville State Gamecocks men's basketball team represented Jacksonville State University during the 2014–15 NCAA Division I men's basketball season. The Gamecocks, led by seventh year head coach James Green, played their home games at the Pete Mathews Coliseum and were members of the East Division of the Ohio Valley Conference. They finished the season 12–19, 5–11 in OVC play to finish in fourth place in the East Division. They failed to qualify for the OVC Tournament.

Roster

Schedule

|-
!colspan=9 style="background:#FF0000; color:#000000;"| Exhibition

|-
!colspan=9 style="background:#FF0000; color:#000000;"| Regular Season

References

Jacksonville State Gamecocks men's basketball seasons
Jacksonville State
Jacksonville State Gamecocks men's basketball
Jacksonville State Gamecocks men's basketball